Kim Yik Yung, born in 1935 in Chongjin, Hamgyong, is a South Korean ceramic artist.

She studied chemical engineering at Seoul National University and then went to the US, where she studied ceramics at Alfred University, New York State. After returning to Korea, she worked as a researcher in the National Museum of Modern and Contemporary Art, South Korea.

Kim was co-winner of the 2004  "Artist of the Year" award from the National Museum of Modern and Contemporary Art for significant contribution to the development of Korean contemporary ceramic art. Her work has been shown in major exhibitions in Korea, Japan, the United States, and Europe.

Education 
 1957 B. S. Degree, Chemical Engineering, Seoul National University
 1958 Finished 1-year course of Ceramic Engineering, Seoul National University
 1959 Finished 1-year course of Crafts and Arts, Hongik University
 1961 M. F. A. College of Ceramics at Alfred University

Experiences 
 1958-1959   Research Assistant, AID Central Design Demonstration Center
 1960-1961   Teaching Assistant, College of Ceramics at Alfred University
 1961-1963   Assistant to the Curator, National Museum of Korea
 1963-1964   Full-time Instructor, Duksung Women's College
 1964-1965   Invitational Research instructor, Kyoto Municipal College of Arts
 1965-1967   Instructor, Housing and Interior Design, Yonsei University
 1967-1968   Research Assistant, AID Design Development Project 
 1969-1974   Planning Manager, Design Development Section, Korea Trade Promotion     Center
 1975-2000  Professor, Ceramics Design, College of Design and Architecture, Kookmin University in Korea
 2000-        Professor emeritus, Kookmin University.

Work in Collections 
 National Gallery of Contemporary Arts, South Korea
 Hoam Art Museum, Seoul, Korea
 Youngeun Museum of Art, Daeyu Cultural Foundation,  Korea
 Everson Museum, Syracuse, U. S. A.
 Cleveland Museum of Art, Cleveland, U. S. A.
 Royal Museum of Mariemont, Brussels, Belgium
 British Museum, United Kingdom
 National Museum of Scotland, United Kingdom
 Victoria and Albert Museum, United kingdom
 Detroit Institute of Art, U. S. A.
 Royal Ontario Museum, Canada
 Smithsonian Institution, U. S. A.
 Taipei National Museum of History, Taipei
 San Francisco Oriental Museum, U. S. A.
 Philadelphia Museum of Arts, U. S. A.
 Chicago Smart Museum, U. S. A.
 Honolulu Academy of Arts, U. S. A.
 Hawaii University Gallery, U. S. A.
 San Antonio Museum of Art, U. S. A.

See also
List of Korean ceramic artists and sculptors
Korean ceramics

External links 
 Kim Yikyung's website
 Korea Times article
 Seoul selection, Kim Yikyung - Interview, 2013
 List of Museums that collect Kim Yikyung's Work, on Map

South Korean artists
1935 births
People from Chongjin
Living people
South Korean potters
South Korean ceramists
South Korean women ceramists
Women potters